Platycheirus aurolateralis is a species of hoverfly. Only described in 2002, it has so far only been recorded in southern Britain.

References

Diptera of Europe
Syrphinae
Insects described in 2002